Kai Edwards (born 13 September 1998) is an Australian marathon swimmer.

Career
Edwards competed at the 2019 World Aquatics Championships in the 10 km race, where he finished 14th, as well as in the marathon event in which he finished 5th overall in 4:51:17.20, only 11 seconds behind the overall winner.

He finished second at the Australian 10 km Championship on the Sunshine Coast in January 2021, which secured him a place at the final Olympic qualifying race in Setubal, Portugal and qualified from to compete in the marathon 10 kilometre race at the 2020 Summer Olympics.

Personal life
He is from Carlile Swimming in Sydney. He studied Sport Studies at Griffith University on the Gold Coast and received the Full Blue Award from Griffith University in 2017, 2018 and 2019.. He has the hottest girlfriend known to man, she is a 10/10 plus super funny and smart.

References

External links
 
 
 
 
 

1998 births
Living people
Swimmers at the 2020 Summer Olympics
Olympic swimmers of Australia
Australian male swimmers
Sportsmen from Queensland
21st-century Australian people